Novi Sad was a men's professional 3x3 basketball club based in Novi Sad, Serbia. The team played in the FIBA 3x3 World Tour. Between 2015 and 2018, the club was based in Abu Dhabi, United Arab Emirates.

The team dissolved after featuring in the 2020 FIBA 3x3 World Tour Europe Masters.

Players

Last roster

Season by season

Trophies and awards

Trophies
FIBA 3x3 World Tour
Winners (4): 2014, 2015, 2018, 2019
Runners-up (2): 2013, 2017

Individual awards
FIBA 3x3 World Tour MVP
 Dušan Domović Bulut – 2015
FIBA 3x3 World Tour Most Spectacular Player
 Dušan Domović Bulut – 2016, 2017
FIBA 3x3 World Tour Final Shoot-Out Contest winner 
 Dejan Majstorović – 2014

Notable players 
 Dušan Bulut
 Dejan Janjić
 Dejan Majstorović
 Strahinja Milošević
 Marko Savić
 Marko Ždero

References

External links
 Novi Sad Al-Wahda at redbull.com

2013 establishments in Serbia
2020 disestablishments in Serbia
FIBA 3x3 World Tour teams
Novi Sad
Basketball teams in the United Arab Emirates
3x3 basketball in Serbia
Basketball teams established in 2013
Basketball teams disestablished in 2020